Wild mint may refer to:

Mentha arvensis
Mentha longifolia